Aphria is a genus of fly in the family Tachinidae.

Species
A. georgiana Townsend, 1908
A. gracilis Mesnil, 1963
A. latifrons (Villeneuve, 1908)
A. longilingua (Rondani, 1861)
A. longirostris (Meigen, 1824)
A. miranda Richter, 1977
A. ocypterata Townsend, 1891
A. potans Wiedemann, 1830
A. rubida Mesnil, 1973
A. servillii Robineau-Desvoidy, 1830
A. xyphias (Pandellé, 1896)

References

Tachininae
Tachinidae genera
Taxa named by Jean-Baptiste Robineau-Desvoidy